The 1969–70 Iraq Central FA Premier League was the 22nd season of the Iraq Central FA League (the top division of football in Baghdad and its neighbouring cities from 1948 to 1973). Eleven teams competed in the tournament, which was played in a single round-robin format rather than a double round-robin format, so each team only played each other once, and Aliyat Al-Shorta won the league title for the third time.

At an Iraqi Olympic Committee meeting on 4 February 1971, it was decided that champions Aliyat Al-Shorta would be Iraq's representative at the 1971 Asian Champion Club Tournament, thus becoming the first Iraqi team to participate in a major continental club competition. Al-Bareed wal-Barq's Kadhim Abboud was top scorer with eight goals.

League table

Results

Top goalscorers

References

External links
 Iraqi Football Website

Iraq Central FA League seasons
Iraq
1969 in Iraqi football
1969 in Iraqi sport
1970 in Iraqi sport